Kilverbach is a small river on the border of Lower Saxony and North Rhine-Westphalia, Germany. It flows into the Else south of Rödinghausen.

See also
List of rivers of Lower Saxony
List of rivers of North Rhine-Westphalia

Rivers of Lower Saxony
Rivers of North Rhine-Westphalia
Rivers of Germany